The Good Soldier Schweik is a 1931 Czechoslovak black-and-white comedy film directed by Martin Frič, based on Jaroslav Hašek's novel The Good Soldier Švejk.

Cast
 Saša Rašilov as Josef Svejk
 Oscar Marion as Lieutenant Karel Lukás (as Oskar Marion)
 Jan Richter as Palivec, innkeeper
 Hugo Haas as MUDr. Katz
 Antonie Nedošinská as Mrs. Müllerová, landlady
 Josef Rovenský as MUDr. Grünstein
 Jaroslav Marvan as Plukovník Kraus
 Jarmila Vacková as Irena Krausová
 Alexander Třebovský as Bretschneider, secret agent
 Milka Balek-Brodská as Countess von Botzenheim
 Eduard Šlégl as Chamberlain
 Felix Kühne as Doctor

References

External links
 

1931 films
1931 comedy films
1930s war comedy films
1930s Czech-language films
Czech black-and-white films
Czechoslovak black-and-white films
Films directed by Martin Frič
The Good Soldier Švejk
Films based on Czech novels
Films based on works by Jaroslav Hašek
World War I films set on the Eastern Front
Czech war comedy films
Czech World War I films
1930s Czech films